Baryties is an unincorporated community in Washington County, in the U.S. state of Missouri.

History
A post office called Baryties was established in 1893, and remained in operation until 1931. The community was so named on account of deposits of barytes in the area.

References

Unincorporated communities in Washington County, Missouri
Unincorporated communities in Missouri